Japreria may be,

 Japreria language
Hyloscirtus japreria, sp. frog